Several ships have been named :

 Japanese steam warship Musashi, an early steam warship of the Imperial Japanese Navy, formerly USRC Kewanee
 , a super yacht built by Feadship and delivered to business magnate Larry Ellison in 2010
 , a Panamanian cargo ship

See also
 Musashi (disambiguation)
 Japanese ship Musashi